Listen to My Word is the first single album by South Korean girl group Oh My Girl. It was released by WM Entertainment on August 1, 2016, distributed by LOEN Entertainment. The album contains four covers of classic K-pop songs, including Papaya's "Listen to My Word (A-ing)" featuring reggae duo Skull and Haha. This is the final release featuring member JinE, as she shortly ceased activities during the promotion to recover and receive treatment.

Release and promotion
On July 15, 2016, Oh My Girl's agency WM Entertainment announced that the group would be releasing a special summer album in August. On July 31, Oh My Girl introduced the album through a live broadcast on Naver's V app, singing a medley of all four songs on the album. The digital album was released on August 1, along with a music video for the title track, "Listen to My Word (A-ing)". The CD version of the album was released on August 4.

Composition
All four songs on the album are covers of classic K-pop songs, re-arranged to have a more contemporary sound. The title track, "Listen to My Word (A-ing)", is a cover of the hit song by girl group Papaya, originally released in 2000. It features reggae duo Skull and Haha and has reggae influences and a hip hop beat. All four songs feature a new rap written by Mimi.

Chart performance
The album debuted at the top of the Gaon Album Chart for July 31 – August 6, 2016. The title track charted at number 15 on the Gaon Digital Chart that same week.

Track listing

Personnel 
Credits adapted from EP liner notes.

Locations

Recorded at Bono Studio ("Listen to My Word (A-ing)", "Christmas in Summer", "Je T'aime")
Recorded at Studio ARK ("Christmas in Summer")
Recorded at Seoul Studio ("Christmas in Summer", "Je T'aime")
Recorded at Mojo Sound ("Christmas in Summer", "Je T'aime")
Edited at Bono Studio ("Listen to My Word (A-ing)", "Je T'aime")
Edited at W Sound ("Christmas in Summer", "I Can See Your Lies")
Mixed at W Sound ("Christmas in Summer", "I Can See Your Lies")
Mixed at Bono Studio ("Listen to My Word (A-ing)", "Je T'aime")
Mastered at JFS Mastering

Personnel

Oh My Girl – vocals
WM Entertainment Inc. – executive producer
Lee Won-min – producer
Kim Jin-mi – executive director
72 – music producer
Moon Jung-kyu – music producer
Seon Yeong – recording engineer
Lee Ji-hong – recording engineer
Jo Jeong-hyun – recording engineer
Go Seung-wook – mixing engineer
Jo Joon-seong – mixing engineer
Kwon Nam-woo – mastering engineer
Soulme – choreography director
Segaji Video – music video director
Jo Dae-young – art direction and design
AHMI – art direction and design
No Yoon-A – art direction and design
Shin Hye-rim – photographer
David Anthony – keyboard, guitar, bass guitar, drum programming (on "Listen to My Word (A-ing)")
Kim Hyun-A – background vocals (on "Listen to My Word (A-ing)", "Je T'aime")
Park Eun-woo – background vocals (on "Listen to My Word (A-ing)")
72 – vocal director (on "Listen to My Word (A-ing)", "Christmas in Summer")
Moon Jung-kyu – vocal director (on "Listen to My Word (A-ing)", "Je T'aime", "I Can See Your Lies"), keyboard (on "I Can See Your Lies"), drum programming (on "I Can See Your Lies")
Seon Yeong – recording engineer (on "Listen to My Word (A-ing)", "Christmas in Summer", "Je T'aime"), digital editor (on "Listen to My Word (A-ing)", "Je T'aime"), mix assistant (on "Listen to My Word (A-ing)", "Je T'aime")
Go Seung-wook – mix engineer (on "Listen to My Word (A-ing)", "Je T'aime")
Kwon Nam-woo – mastering engineer (on "Listen to My Word (A-ing)", "Christmas in Summer", "Je T'aime", "I Can See Your Lies")
Jeon Yeong-ho – piano (on "Christmas in Summer")
Jeong Jae-pil – guitar (on "Christmas in Summer", "I Can See Your Lies")
Lee Beom-suk – bass guitar (on "Christmas in Summer", "Je T'aime", "I Can See Your Lies"), vocal director (on "Christmas in Summer")
Park Eun-chan – drum programming (on "Christmas in Summer", "Je T'aime")
Go Min-ae – background vocal (on "Christmas in Summer")
Jo Jeong-hyun – recording engineer (on "Christmas in Summer")
Jeong Ki-hong – recording engineer (on "Christmas in Summer", "Je T'aime")
Ji Yeong-ju – recording assistant (on "Christmas in Summer", "Je T'aime")
Kim Gap-su – recording engineer (on "Christmas in Summer", "Je T'aime")
Song Hye-jin – recording assistant (on "Christmas in Summer", "Je T'aime")
Heo Eun-sook – digital editor (on "Christmas in Summer", "I Can See Your Lies"), mix assistant (on "Christmas in Summer", "I Can See Your Lies")
Choi Ja-yeon – mix assistant (on "Christmas in Summer", "I Can See Your Lies")
Jo Joon-seong – mixing engineer (on "Christmas in Summer", "I Can See Your Lies")
Jeon Yeong-ho – piano (on "Je T'aime")
Ruvin – guitar, background vocals, vocal director (on "Je T'aime")
Lee Mi-ji – background vocals (on "Je T'aime")
Kang Tae-woo – background vocals (on "I Can See Your Lies")
Lee Ji-hong – recording engineer (on "I Can See Your Lies")

Charts

References

External links
"Listen to My Word (A-ing)" music video on YouTube

Oh My Girl albums
2016 EPs
Covers EPs
Korean-language EPs
Kakao M EPs
Single albums